Place names in India are usually in Indian languages. Other languages include Portuguese, Dutch, English and Arabic.

Since Indian Independence, several Indian cities have adopted pre-English names, most notably Chennai (formerly Madras), Mumbai (formerly Bombay), Kolkata (formerly Calcutta), Bengaluru (formerly Bangalore), Visakhapatnam (formerly Waltair), and Pune (formerly Poona).

Common place names
Most place names are named after prominent geographical features, such as rivers and lakes. Others are named after personalities such as kings or historical figures. Although Hindu history was a main influence, Islamic and Christian influences are present, particularly in central and northern India.

 -abad - "city" - from Persian ābād (آباد)
 garh - "fort, castle" - Hindi gaṛh (गढ़)
 nagar/nagara - "town" - from Sanskrit nagara (नगर)
 prayag, -prayaga - "confluence" - from Sanskrit prayāga (प्रयाग)
 -pore, -pur, -pura - "city" - from Sanskrit pura (पुर)

Anglicized names
Some anglicized names have been officially changed to reflect native pre-colonial spellings. The names of the cities, towns, and villages are usually in Indian languages, while most street names carry English names. Examples: Washermanpet, George Town, Chennai

Variations
Certain names have variations in different languages. Oor/Ooru is a common Dravidian name which means a place, also known as Oor in Tamil and Malayalam, whereas it is called Ooru in Telugu and Kannada.

Andhra Pradesh and Telangana
Common suffixes include, -ooru, -palli, -pudi, -peta, etc.

{| class="wikitable sortable"
! Suffix !! Meaning 
!Etymology!! Examples
|-
| -abad ||city 
|Urdu آباد < Persian ـآباد/آباد < Middle Persian ʾp̄ʾt''' (ābād, “populous, thriving, prosperous”). < Proto-Iranian *āpāta-, < Proto-Indo-European *peh₂- (“to protect”)|| Hyderabad, Secunderabad, Nizamabad
|-
| -bagh ||town 
|Urdu باغ ("garden") < Persian باغ‎ bâğ < Middle Persian 𐭡𐭠𐭢‎ (bāɣ, “garden, orchard”) <  Proto-Indo-Iranian *bʰāgá- (“portion, share, allotment”) < Proto-Indo-European *bʰeh₂g- (“to divide, distribute, allot”)||Suryabagh, Nausena Baugh
|-
| -cherla || town 
|Telugu చర్ల (charla "town")||Macherla, Chengicherla
|-
| -guda/-gudem/-gudemu || village 
|Telugu గూడ (gūḍa "village. hamlet") < Telugu గూడెం (gūḍem) గూడెము (gūḍemu)|| Tadepalligudem, Galigudem, Dumbriguda
|-
| -kot/-kota || fort 
|Telugu కోట (kōṭa "fort, fortress") < Proto-South-Dravidian *kōṭṭay ("fort, castle).|| Samalkot, Kasimkota, 
Sriharikota
|-
| -nagar/-nagaram/-nagaru ||town 
|Telugu నగర్ (nagar), నగరం (nagaraṁ), నగరు (nagaru) < Proto-South-Dravidian *nakar ("town, city").||Karimnagar, Mahabubnagar, Vizianagaram,
|-
| -ole/-olu ||town 
|Anglicized Telugu -ole < Telugu ఓలు (ōlu "town") < Old Telugu ప్రోలు (prōlu "city, town")||Ongole, Nidadvolu
|-
| -ooru/-oor/-ore/-ur/-uru
|village
|Anglicized Telugu -ore < Telugu ఊరు (ūru "village") < Proto-Dravidian *ūr ("village, habitation")
|Guntur, Nellore, Chittoor, Eluru, Anantapur
|-
| -palem/-palemu/-palle/-pallem/-pallemu/-palli
|village
|Telugu పాలెం (pāleṁ), పాలెము (pālemu), పల్లె (palle), పల్లెం (palleṁ), పల్లెము (pallemu) < Telugu పల్లి (palli "village") పల్లీ (pallī "village") < Proto-Dravidian *paḷḷi ("(small) village")
|Peddapalli, Madanapalle, Nadimpalle
|-
| -patnam/-patnamu
|port city 
|Telugu పట్నం (paṭnaṁ "patnam")
|Vishakhapatnam, Machilipatnam, Krishnapatnam
|-
| -pedu
|
|
|Yerpedu
|-
| -pudi
|village 
|(Old?) Telugu పుడి (pudi "village")
|Kuchipudi
|-
| -pur/-puram/-puramu/-puri
|city 
|Telugu పూర్ (pūr) పూరం (pūraṁ) పూరము (pūramu) పూరి (pūri) < Sanskrit पुर (pura) < Proto-Indo-European *pl̥h₁- (“stronghold”) 
|Markapur, Hindpur, Atchutapuram
|-
| -put/-puttu
|village 
|Telugu పుట్టు (puṭṭu "village, put") < Proto-Dravidian (?)
|Manchingiput, Jalaput,
|-
| -seema
|region 
|Telugu సీమ (sīma "region, kingdom") < Sanskrit सीमा (sīmā "border, region")
|Rayalaseema
|-
| -vada/-wada
|area, place 
|Telugu వాడ (vāḍa "area, place")
|Vijayawada, Vemulawada
|-
| -vaka/-waka 
|town
|Telugu వాక (vāka "town")
|Gajuwaka, Hanumanthavaka
|-
| -valasa
|town
|Telugu వలస (valasa "town, migration")
|Thangarapuvalasa, Palavalasa
|}

Arunachal Pradesh
Namdapha National park, Roing, Tezu, Sakteng Wildlife sanctuary, Namsai, Parsurum Kund, Bhairabkunda, Khonsa, Jairampur, Bhismaknagar, Changlang, Hawai, Nampong, Koloriang, etc.

Bihar
Bodh Gaya, Patna, Rajgir, Gaya, Raxaul, Muzaffarpur, Darbhanga, Pawapuri, Sasaram, Hajipur, Bihar Sharif, Kesaria, Sonpur, Munger and Bhagalpur Division.

Chhattisgarh
Raipur, Jagdalpur, Bilaspur, Durg, Kanger Ghati National Park, Bhilai, Sirpur, Ambikapur, Korba, Kawardha, Raigarh, Dongargarh, Tirarthgar, Atal Nagar, Mainpat, Indravati National Park, Ratanpur, Rajim, Chitrakoot, Rajnandgaon, Dhamtari, Kanker and Champa.

Delhi
New Delhi, Gurugram, Mehrauli, Karol Bagh, Delhi, Rohini, Chanakyapuri, Sonipat, Dwarka, Vasant Kunj, Pitam Pura, Bahadurgarh, Greater Kailash,
Delhi Cantonment, Shahpur Jat, Shahdara, Najafgarh, Badarpurh, Nangloi Jat, Saidul Ajaib and Bawana.

Goa
Panaji, Calangute, Palolem Beach, Anjuna, Baga, Old Goa, Candolim, Margao, Vagator, Colva, Dona Paula, Vasco Da Gama, Mandrem, Morjim,
Canacona, Mapusa, Arpora, Bogmalo Beach, Benaulim, Cavelossim, Ponda, Varca, Bardez, Majorda, Mobor, Dabolim, Agonda and Mormugao.

 Gujarat 

Jammu and Kashmir
Pangong Tso, Zanskar, Nyak Tso, Samba, Ramban, Khardong, Manikiala and Ranjit Sagar Dam Lake.

Jharkhand
Ranchi, Jamshedpur, Purulia, Deoghar, Dhanbad, Maithon, Hazaribagh, Netarhat, Bokaro Steel City, Ghatshila, Giridih, Rajmahal, Dumka,
Parasnath Hill, Rajrappa, Medininagar, Patratu, Chaibasa, Panchet, Betla, Deoghar, Sahebganj, Pakur, Kodarma and McCluskieganj, Gumla.

Karnataka
Common endings are Ooru, Palaya, Halli, Pete, Seeme. Less common are prefixes such as Sri.
 

Kerala
Common suffixes include Angadi, Athani, Ur, Cheri/Shery, Kulam, Kad, Nad, Pally, Kode/Code, Kara, Mangalam, Kal, Puram, and Puzha.
Ur - Nilambur, Tirur, Thrissur, Kannur, North Paravur.
Cheri/Shery - Thalassery, Cherpulassery, Kalpakanchery, Manjeri, Thamarassery.
Nad - Eranad, Kuttanad, Valluvanad, Wayanad, Thondernad.
Kulam - Kunnamkulam, Mararikulam, Mankulam, Unnikulam, Punnayurkulam.
Angadi - Parappanangadi, Tirurangadi, Pazhavangadi, Melangadi.
Athani - Athani, Puthanathani, Karinkallathani
Kad - Puthukkad, Purakkad, Thalakkad, Palakkad, Vadakkekad.
Kode/Code - Kozhikode, Puthucode, Alamcode, Areekode, Veliyankode.
Kara - Mavelikkara, Edakkara, Mullurkara, Anakkara, Ramanattukara.
Mangalam - Kunnamangalam, Chathamangalam, Kunhimangalam, Chendamangalam, Enadimangalam.
Pally - Karthikappally, Puthuppally, Kanjirappally, Vadanappally, Pulpally.
Kal - Kottakkal, Chirakkal, Pothukal, Pulikkal, Edamulackal.
Puram - Thiruvananthapuram, Malappuram, Angadipuram, Sivapuram, Kadampazhipuram.
Puzha - Alappuzha, Muvattupuzha, Thodupuzha, Cherupuzha, Noolpuzha.

Maharashtra
Common suffixes include Pur, Ner, Gav, Abad, Khed, Oli, Wadi, Nagar, Tur, Vali, and Ra.
Pur - Nagpur, Solapur, Chandrapur, Kolhapur, Badlapur, Achalpur, Ballarpur, Pandharpur, Malkapur, Indapur, Jaysinghpur, Tulijapur, Murtijapur, Shirpur, Shirampur
Ner - Sangamner, Jamner, Parner, Amalner, Saoner
Gav - Jalgaon, Malegaon, Khamgaon, Kopargaon, Tasgaon, Majalgaon, Shegaon, Koregaon, Varangaon, Chalisgaon
Abad - Aurangabad, Osmanabad, Khultabad, Dharmabad, Daulatabad
Khed - Sindkhed, Jamkhed, Mudkhed, Narkhed, Gangakhed, Umarkhed
Oli - Gadchiroli, Hingoli, Dapoli, Saoli, Sakoli, Wagholi, Biloli, Khopoli, Padoli
Wadi - Hinjawadi, Vaibhavwadi, Kurduwadi, Sanaswadi, Sawantwadi, Wadi, Yewalewadi, Ghulewadi, Darewadi
Nagar - Ahmednagar, Rajgurunagar, Ulhasnagar, Urjanagar, Shivajinagar
Tur - Latur, Patur, Partur, Jintur
Vali - Borivali, Kandivali, Karivali
Ra - Bhandara, Rajura, Nandura

Manipur
Imphal, Loktak Lake, Moreh, Moirang, Ukrhul, Andro, Bishnupur, Shirui, Kakching, Churachandpur, Tamenglong, Thoubaul, Khangkhui, Jiribam, Leimaram, Khonghampat, Khongjom, Leimakhong, Tengnoupaul, Chandel, Kangpokpi, Senapati, Nambol, Nony, Jessami, Singda, Thanga and Khayang.

Mizoram
Aizawl, Lunglei, Champhai, Thenzhal, Murlen National Park, Serchhip, Murlen, Siaha, Kolasib, Hmuifang, Vairegte, Mamit, Saitual, Lengteng Wildlife Sanctuary, Zokhawthar, Baktawng, Farkawn, Phulpui, Sialsuk, Khawnlung, Tlabung, Lengpui and Ngengpui Wildlife Sanctuary.

Orissa
In Odisha (formerly known as Orissa) common suffixes are Pur, Garh, Gada.

Tamil Nadu
In Tamil Nadu, common suffixes are Oor, Nagaram, Puram, Kudi, Cheri, Paakkam, Pattinam, Palayam, Kaadu, Pettai, Mangalam, Seemai, naththam, palli and Kuppam. One common prefix is Thiru. The majority of names are in Tamil language. Telugu and Kannada place names can be seen in border areas. Sanskrit names are found because of the historical relationship of Sanskrit with Hinduism.

Tripura
Common suffix include mura.

 
West Bengal

Global Indian influence in place names

See Indosphere, Sanskritization, Indianization of Southeast Asia.

In the Indianised cultures outside India, places were given Sanskritised names to make them sound more noble. Examples include:

 Ayutthaya in Thailand, named after Ayodhya, Rama's hometown.
 Bandar Seri Begawan, the capital of Brunei, named after "bhagavān", a title for gods. "Seri Begawan" was used as a title for Sultan Omar Ali Saifuddien III after he abdicated from the throne.
 Jayapura in Papua, Indonesia named from two Sanskrit words Jaya meaning "victorious" and Pura meaning "town". The name was given by the first president and founding father of the country, Sukarno.
 Yogyakarta in Java, Indonesia named after the city of Ayodhya in India, the hometown of Sri Rama. "Yogyakarta" means "fit to prosper".
 Siak Sri Indrapura in Sumatra, Indonesia named after the disbanded Sultanate of Siak Sri Indrapura. "Indrapura" means "town of Indra".
 Nakhon Si Thammarat in Thailand, from the Pali words "nagara srī dhammaraja", or "city of the lord and king who rules by dharma".
 Putrajaya in Malaysia, which means "victorious prince" or "victorious son".
 Singapura, which means "lion city" named by prince Parameswara from Palembang, South Sumatra present Indonesia

Indonesia
Indonesia, as a hugely Sanskrit and Indic-influenced country, contains many Sanskrit-named cities and placements:
 kota - "city", from Tamil kōṭṭam (கோட்டம், "town") — e.g. Kota Pinang, Lima Puluh Kota Regency, Kotabumi, Kotabaru, Kotamobagu, Kotawaringin, etc.
 negara - "state", from Sanskrit नगर (nagara) means "country" in Indonesian. The word Nagari is also a term used in West Sumatra referring to "village".  
 pura - "town", from Sanskrit पुर (pur) — e.g. Jayapura, Siak Sri Indrapura, Amlapura, Sangkapura, Semarapura, etc. In Indonesia, pura'' also refers to a Hindu temple.

Malaysia
 kota - "city", from Tamil kōṭṭam (கோட்டம், "town")
 negeri - "state" or "country", from Sanskrit nagarī (नगरी, "city")
Rajwada

Thailand
 nakhon (นคร) [ná(ʔ).kʰɔ̄ːn] - "city"
 buri (บุรี) [bū.rīː] - "town"
 samut (สมุทร) [sàmùt] - "sea"
 si (ศรี) [sǐ] - "lord"

See also
 Renaming of cities in India
 List of Indian cities on rivers
 List of towns in India by population
 Oikonyms in Western and South Asia

References

Place name etymologies
 
Geography of India